BID/60, also called Singlet, was a British encryption machine. It was used by the British intelligence services from around 1949 or 1950 onwards. The system is a rotor machine, and would appear to have used 10 rotors. There are some apparent similarities between this machine and the US / NATO KL-7 device.

In 2005, a Singlet machine was exhibited in the Enigma and Friends display at the Bletchley Park museum.

References

External links
 Jerry Proc's page on BID/60

Rotor machines
Cryptographic hardware
Cold War military equipment of the United Kingdom